Ricardo Gregorio Faccio Porta, known as Ricardo Faccio or Riccardo Faccio (12 March 1907 – 9 September 1970) was a Uruguayan-Italian professional footballer who played as a midfielder. He was born in Uruguay and played for the Uruguay national football team but later received Italian citizenship and played for Italy internationally., where he was a part of the squad that won the 1933-35 Central European International Cup.

Career
Born in Durazno Department, Faccio began playing football for Club Universal and Montevideo Wanderers F.C. In 1934, he moved to Italy to play for Ambrosiana-Inter.

International 
Italy
 Central European International Cup: 1933-35

References

External links

1907 births
1970 deaths
People from Durazno Department
Uruguayan footballers
Uruguay international footballers
Montevideo Wanderers F.C. players
Club Nacional de Football players
Italian footballers
Italy international footballers
Serie A players
Inter Milan players
C.A. Bella Vista players
Dual internationalists (football)
Association football midfielders
Danubio F.C. managers